The 2000 Idaho Vandals football team represented the University of Idaho in the Big West Conference during the 2000 NCAA Division I-A football season. Led by first-year head coach Tom Cable, the Vandals were  overall ( in Big West, third).

Idaho played only one of their four home games at the Kibbie Dome, an indoor facility on campus in Moscow, Idaho; the other three were at Martin Stadium at Washington State University in nearby Pullman, Washington.

In the Battle of the Palouse, Idaho defeated neighboring Washington State for the second  the previous two victories in this series were  earlier and also in consecutive years under different head coaches: 1964  and 1965

Schedule

NFL Draft
Two Vandal seniors were selected in the 2001 NFL Draft, which lasted seven rounds (246 selections).

List of Idaho Vandals in the NFL Draft

References

External links
Gem of the Mountains: 2001 University of Idaho yearbook – 2000 football season
Idaho Argonaut – student newspaper – 2000 editions

Idaho
Idaho Vandals football seasons
Idaho Vandals football